Body of Lies is the soundtrack of the film of the same name. It was released on October 14, 2008 by Varèse Sarabande. German-born film composer Marc Streitenfeld reunited with director Ridley Scott to score the film, marking his third score in a row and eighth consecutive music collaboration with Scott.

Streitenfeld traveled to Morocco to collaborate with Scott for the spy film, which required a score to support its technological and political style. Streitenfeld used a 90-piece orchestra as well as woods and choir to create the score. Recording all the elements separately allowed Streitenfeld to have more command over the final sound mix.

Track listing
 "White Whale" – 2:14
 "Punishment" – 1:36
 "To Amman" – 2:42
 "Aisha" – 2:11
 "All by Himself" – 1:32
 "Burning Safehouse" – 1:46
 "Al-Saleem" – 2:05
 "Manchester Raid" – 2:40
 "Chased" – 1:35
 "NSA Speech" – 2:46
 "Tortured" – 2:13
 "Dead Sea" – 1:16
 "No Touch" – 1:21
 "I Am Out" – 2:37
 "Rabid Dogs" – 2:49
 "Lost Vision" – 2:00
 "Never Lie to Me" – 1:14
 "I Shutter to Think" – 2:27
 "Half Steps" – 1:28
 "Making the Call" – 1:11
 "My Fault" – 1:53
 "Betrayal" – 3:31

References

2008 soundtrack albums
Varèse Sarabande soundtracks
Action film soundtracks
Thriller film soundtracks